Haplophaedia is a small genus of hummingbirds, which – together with the members of the genus Eriocnemis – are known as pufflegs. They are found at low levels in humid forest, woodland and shrub at altitudes of 1200 to 3100 m. asl in the Andes of Bolivia, Peru, Ecuador, and Colombia. All species have a straight black bill, a coppery-green plumage, and a slightly forked dark blue tail. The leg-puffs are white in the greenish and hoary pufflegs, and buff-tinged in the buff-thighed puffleg.

Species
Three species are currently recognized, though the buff-thighed puffleg is sometimes considered a subspecies of the greenish puffleg.

References 

 Heynen, I. (1999). Genus Haplophaedia. Pp. 643 in: del Hoyo, J., Elliott, A., & Sargatal, J. eds. (1999). Handbook of the Birds of the World. Vol. 5. Barn-owls to Hummingbirds. Lynx Edicions, Barcelona.

External links 

 
Bird genera
Taxa named by Eugène Simon
Taxonomy articles created by Polbot